Peter Blackmore (Q3 1879 – 1937) was an English footballer who played as a forward. Born in Gorton, Manchester, he played for Newton Heath, making one appearance in The Football League and one in the FA Cup.

External links
Profile at MUFCInfo.com

1879 births
Year of death missing
English footballers
Association football forwards
Manchester United F.C. players